This article serves as an index - as complete as possible - of all the honorific orders or similar decorations received by the governors of Sabah, classified by continent, awarding country and recipient.

State of Sabah 

 Datu Mustapha Datu Harun (1st Governor of Sabah  - ) : 
   Founding Grand Master of the Order of Kinabalu (founded 9 October 1963)
 Pangiran Ahmad Raffae (2nd Governor of Sabah  - ) : 
  Grand Master of the Order of Kinabalu
 Mohd Fuad Stephens (3rd Governor of Sabah  - ) : 
  Grand Master of the Order of Kinabalu
 Mohd Hamdan (4th Governor of Sabah  - ) : 
  Grand Master of the Order of Kinabalu
 Ahmad Koroh (5th Governor of Sabah  - ) : 
  Grand Master of the Order of Kinabalu
 Mohamad Adnan Robert (6th Governor of Sabah  - ) : 
  Grand Master of the Order of Kinabalu
 Mohd Said Keruak (7th Governor of Sabah  - ) : 
  Grand Master of the Order of Kinabalu
 Sakaran Dandai (8th Governor of Sabah  - ) : 
  Grand Master of the Order of Kinabalu
 Ahmadshah Abdullah (9th Governor of Sabah  - ) : 
  Grand Master of the Order of Kinabalu
 Juhar Mahiruddin (10th Governor of Sabah  - present) :
  Companion of the Order of Kinabalu (ASDK)
  Commander of the Order of Kinabalu (PGDK) with title Datuk
  Grand Master and Grand Commander of the Order of Kinabalu (SPDK)  with title Datuk Seri Panglima
 Norlidah Binti Datuk RM Jasni, his wife :
  Member of the Order of Kinabalu (ADK)
  Grand Master and Grand Commander of the Order of Kinabalu (SPDK)  with title Datuk Seri Panglima 
 J.P.

Malaysia, sultanates and states

Malaysia 

 Juhar Mahiruddin (10th Governor of Sabah  - present) : 
   first Companion (JMN), later Grand Commander Order of the Defender of the Realm (SMN) with title Tun
  Recipient of the Order for Important Services (Malaysia) (PJN)

Asian honours

Far East  

To be completed if any ...

Middle East   

 Datu Mustapha Datu Harun (1st Governor of Sabah  - ) : Order of merit Lebanese

American  honours 

To be completed if any ...

British honours 

Robert Haig Hansen - Police Chief, Borneo
Grand Commander Order of the Defender of the Realm (SMN) with title Tun 1963

African honours 

To be completed if any ...

References

Notes 

 
Sabah